Kepler-11, also designated as 2MASS J19482762+4154328, is a Sun-like star slightly larger than the Sun in the constellation Cygnus, located some 2,150 light years from Earth. It is located within the field of vision of the Kepler spacecraft, the satellite that NASA's Kepler Mission uses to detect planets that may be transiting their stars. Announced on February 2, 2011, the star system is among the most compact and flattest systems yet discovered. It is the first discovered case of a star system with six transiting planets. All discovered planets are larger than Earth, with the larger ones being about Neptune's size.

Nomenclature and history
Kepler-11 and its planets were discovered by NASA's Kepler Mission, a mission tasked with discovering planets in transit around their stars. The transit method that Kepler uses involves detecting dips in brightness in stars. These dips in brightness can be interpreted as planets whose orbits move in front of their stars from the perspective of Earth. Kepler-11 is the first discovered exoplanetary system with more than three transiting planets.

Kepler-11 is named for the Kepler Mission: it is the 11th star with confirmed planets discovered in the Kepler field of view.
The planets are named alphabetically, starting with the innermost: b, c, d, e, f, and g, distinguishers that are tagged onto the name of their home star.

Characteristics
Kepler-11 is a G-type star that is approximately  104% the mass of and 102% the radius of the Sun. It has a surface temperature of about 5836 K and is estimated to have an age of around 3.2 billion years. In comparison, the Sun is about 4.6 billion years old and has a surface temperature of 5778 K.

With an apparent magnitude of 14.2, it is too faint to be seen with the naked eye.

Planetary system
All known planets transit the star; this means that all six planets' orbits appear to cross in front of their star as viewed from the Earth's perspective. Their inclinations relative to Earth's line of sight, or how far above or below the plane of sight they are, vary by a little more than a degree. This allows direct measurements of the planets' periods and relative diameters (compared to the host star) by monitoring each planet's transit of the star. Simulations suggest that the mean mutual inclinations of the planetary orbits are about 1°, meaning the system is probably more coplanar (flatter) than the Solar System, where the corresponding figure is 2.3°.

The estimated masses of planets b - f fall in the range between those of Earth and Neptune. Their estimated densities, all lower than that of Earth, imply that none of them have an Earth-like composition; a significant hydrogen/helium atmosphere is predicted for planets c, d, e, f, and g, while planet b may be surrounded by a steam atmosphere or perhaps by a hydrogen atmosphere.  The low densities likely result from high-volume extended atmospheres that surround cores of iron, rock, and possibly H2O.  The inner constituents of the Kepler-11 system were, at the time of their discoveries, the most comprehensively understood extrasolar planets smaller than Neptune.  Currently, observations do not place a firm constraint on the mass of planet g (<25 ME).  However, formation and evolution studies indicate that the mass of planet g is not much greater than about 7 ME.

Kepler-11 planets may have formed in situ (i.e., at their observed orbital locations) or ex situ, that is, they may have started their formation farther away from the star while migrating inward through gravitational interactions with a gaseous protoplanetary disk. This second scenario predicts that a substantial fraction of the planets' mass is in H2O.  Regardless of the formation scenario, the gaseous component of the planets accounts for less than about 20% of their masses but for ≈40 to ≈60% of their radii. In 2014, the dynamical simulation shown what the Kepler-11 planetary system have likely to undergone a substantial inward migration in the past, producing an observed pattern of lower-mass planets on tightest orbits. Additional yet unobserved gas giant planets on wider orbit are likely necessary for migration of smaller planets to proceed that far inward.

The system is among the most compact known; the orbits of planets b - f would easily fit inside the orbit of Mercury, with g only slightly outside it. Despite this close packing of the orbits, dynamical integrations indicate the Kepler-11 system has the potential to be stable on a time scale of billions of years. However, it may be approaching instability due to a secular resonance involving b and c. If this happens, b will most likely become eccentric enough that it collides with c.

None of the planets are in low-ratio orbital resonances, in which multiple planets gravitationally tug on and stabilize each other's orbits, resulting in simple ratios of their orbital periods. However, b and c are close to a 5:4 ratio.

There could conceivably be other planets in the system that do not transit the star, but they would only be detectable by the effects of their gravity on the motion of the visible planets (much as how Neptune was discovered). The presence of additional gas giant planets is currently excluded up to orbital radius of 30 AU.

See also
 List of multiplanetary systems
 Kepler Mission
 Gliese 581
 55 Cancri
 HD 10180

References

External links

 Official release: NASA's Kepler Spacecraft Discovers Extraordinary New Planetary System
 YouTube: Animation of Kepler-11 planetary system
 Kepler 11 Planetary System with Orbits and Planet Sizes
 Astronomers Find 6-Pack of Planets in Alien Solar System
 

 
Planetary systems with six confirmed planets
G-type main-sequence stars
Planetary transit variables
Cygnus (constellation)
157